Beals Coleman Wright (December 19, 1879 – August 23, 1961) was an American tennis player who was active at the end of the 1890s and early 1900s. He won the singles title at the 1905 U.S. National Championships. Wright was a two-time Olympic gold medalist, and the older brother of American tennis player Irving Wright.

Biography
Beals was born in Boston, Massachusetts on December 19, 1879 to George Wright, the shortstop for the Cincinnati Red Stockings and founder of the sporting goods store Wright & Ditson. Beals was the brother of Irving Wright, the 1917 and 1918  U.S. Championship men's doubles champion. Together they won the men's doubles title at the Canadian Tennis Championship four times (1902, 1903, 1904, 1905). Beals was the nephew of baseball pioneer Harry Wright.

In 1899 Beals Wright traveled with his father to California where he played at the Delmonte Tennis Championship in Monterey. George Wright managed the team the same year he coached at Harvard.  Two Harvard University players participated in the DelMonte Tournament-the first time east coast players took on California tennis champions.

Wright played at the 1904 St. Louis Olympics and won gold medals in both the singles and doubles competition. He also won three consecutive singles titles (1904–1906) at the tournament now known as the Cincinnati Masters, and reached the doubles final (with Edgar Leonard) in 1904.

Wright won the Canadian Tennis Championship, played in Niagara-on-the-Lake, in 1902, 1903 and 1904. In 1902 he won the Niagara International Tennis Tournament, also played in Niagara-on-the-Lake, by defeating Harold Hackett in the final in five sets and the default of Raymond Little in the challenge round.

Wright's most important victory came in 1905 when he won the men's singles title at the U.S. National Championships by defeating reigning champion Holcombe Ward in the Challenge Round in straight sets 6–2, 6–1, 11–9.

In 1915 he was hit by an errant baseball during a baseball game. In 1921 he was arrested following a car accident.

Beals Wright was inducted in the International Tennis Hall of Fame in 1956. He died in Alton, Illinois on  August 23, 1961.

Playing style
In their book R.F. and H.L. Doherty - On Lawn Tennis (1903) multiple Wimbledon champions Reginald and Lawrence Doherty described Wright's playing style:

On Lawn Tennis - 1903

Grand Slam finals

Singles: 4 (1 title, 3 runners-up)

Doubles: 7 (3 titles, 4 runners-up)

References

External links
 
 
 
 
 
 

1879 births
1961 deaths
American male tennis players
Olympic gold medalists for the United States in tennis
People from Alton, Illinois
Tennis players from Boston
International Tennis Hall of Fame inductees
Tennis players at the 1904 Summer Olympics
United States National champions (tennis)
Grand Slam (tennis) champions in men's singles
Grand Slam (tennis) champions in men's doubles
Medalists at the 1904 Summer Olympics